Dhanha is a village near Dibba in the United Arab Emirates. It is located in the western side of the city and it is the first village in the Dibba - Masafi Road. 

Populated places in the Emirate of Fujairah